Martin Kelly (born 5 December 1989) is an Irish former rugby union player. He played as a prop and represented Dublin University in the All-Ireland League before joining Munster.

Munster

Kelly joined Munster from Dublin University at the beginning of the 2014–15 season. In June 2015, it was announced that Kelly would be leaving Munster.

References

External links
Munster Profile
DUFC Profile

Living people
1989 births
Rugby union players from County Kilkenny
Irish rugby union players
Dublin University Football Club players
Munster Rugby players
Rugby union props